Pinchon is a French surname. Notable people with the surname include:

 Robert Antoine Pinchon (1886–1943), French Post-Impressionist landscape painter
 Émile Pinchon, French sculptor
 John Pinchon (d. 1573), English Member of Parliament
 Joseph Pinchon (1871–1953), French illustrator, co-creator of the comic strip heroine Bécassine
 William Pinchon (1175–1234), Bishop of Saint-Brieuc, Brittany, France

See also 
 Pynchon

French-language surnames